Cuba competed at the 2016 Summer Olympics in Rio de Janeiro, Brazil, from 5 to 21 August 2016. This was the nation's twentieth appearance at the Summer Olympics. The Cuban team consisted of 124 athletes, 89 men and 35 women, across eighteen sports.

Cuba returned home from Rio de Janeiro with a total of 11 medals (5 gold, 2 silver, and 4 bronze), its lowest haul in Summer Olympic history since 1976 based on the overall tally. Six of these medals were awarded to the Cuban team in boxing, three in wrestling, and one each in athletics and judo (both of which were won by women).

The most significant Cuban highlight of the Games came from Mijaín López, who successfully defended his super heavyweight title in Greco-Roman wrestling, matching a historic "three-peat" effort with Russian legend Alexander Karelin in the same sport category. Moreover, Lopez joined heavyweight boxers Teófilo Stevenson (1972–1980) and Félix Savón (1992–2000) as the only Cubans to ever achieve three successive Olympic titles.

Boxers Robeisy Ramírez (bantamweight), Arlen López (middleweight), and Julio César La Cruz (light heavyweight) contributed three of the country's gold medals through their respective weight categories, while reigning world lightweight champion Ismael Borrero added the Olympic title to his career treasury in Greco-Roman wrestling. On the women's side, judoka Idalys Ortiz completed a full set of medals at her third Olympics with a silver in the heavyweight class (+78 kg), bowing out her title defense to France's Émilie Andéol. Meanwhile, world champion Dénia Caballero collected the country's only track and field medal with a bronze in the discus throw.

Medalists

| width=78% align=left valign=top |

| width=22% align=left valign=top |

Competitors
The Cuban Olympic Committee fielded a team of 124 athletes, 89 men and 35 women, across 18 sports at the Games. Although its full roster was roughly larger by 13 athletes than in London four years earlier, it was still one of Cuba's smallest delegations sent to the Olympics since 1964.

Men's volleyball was the only collective sport in which Cuba qualified for the Games, having returned to the Olympic scene after a sixteen-year absence. For individual-based sports, Cuba made its Olympic debut in badminton, as well as its return to fencing, modern pentathlon, and beach volleyball after being absent from London 2012, and artistic gymnastics after 12 years. Track and field accounted for the largest number of athletes on the Cuban team, with 43 entries. There was a single competitor each in archery, badminton, fencing, and taekwondo.

Fifteen of Cuba's past Olympic medalists returned, including defending champions Idalys Ortiz (judo, women's +78 kg), boxers Robeisy Ramírez (bantamweight) and Roniel Iglesias (welterweight), and rapid fire pistol shooter Leuris Pupo, who headed the roster as the most experienced competitor going to his fifth straight Games. Aiming for a historic golden three-peat in the super heavyweight category, Greco-Roman wrestler Mijaín López was selected to lead the Cuban delegation for the third consecutive time as the flag bearer in the opening ceremony. Moreover, he matched the record of boxing legend Teófilo Stevenson, who carried the Cuban flag at Munich 1972, Montreal 1976, and Moscow 1980.

Seventeen-year-old artistic gymnast Marcia Vidiaux was Cuba's youngest competitor, with skeet shooter and Athens 2004 bronze medalist Juan Miguel Rodríguez rounding out the field as the oldest competitor (aged 49).

Other notable athletes on the Cuban roster included 2015 world silver medalist Manrique Larduet in men's artistic gymnastics, pole vaulter Yarisley Silva, world boxing champions Joahnys Argilagos (light flyweight), Yosvany Veitía (flyweight), Lázaro Álvarez (lightweight), Arlen López (middleweight), and Julio César La Cruz (light heavyweight), world-ranked rower Ángel Fournier in the men's single sculls, and Greco-Roman wrestler Ismael Borrero (men's 59 kg).

| width=78% align=left valign=top |
The following is the list of number of competitors participating in the Games. Note that reserves in fencing are not counted as athletes:

Archery

One Cuban archer has qualified for the men's individual recurve at the Olympics by receiving a spare berth freed up by El Salvador as the next highest-ranked eligible athlete, not yet qualified, at the Pan American Qualification Tournament in Medellín, Colombia.

Athletics (track and field)

Cuban athletes have so far achieved qualifying standards in the following athletics events (up to a maximum of 3 athletes in each event):

Following the end of the qualifying period on July 11, 2016, a total of 43 athletes (24 men and 19 women) were named to the Cuban track and field roster, as part of the nation's official team announcement nine days later. Among them featured hurdler and Beijing 2008 champion Dayron Robles, London 2012 medalists Yarisley Silva (pole vault) and Leonel Suárez (decathlon), 2015 world champion Dénia Caballero, and triple jumper and world leader Pedro Pablo Pichardo.

Track & road events
Men

Women

Field events
Men

Women

Combined events – Men's decathlon

Combined events – Women's heptathlon

Badminton

Cuba has qualified one badminton player for the men's singles into the Olympic tournament. Osleni Guerrero had claimed his Olympic spot as one of top 34 individual shuttlers in the BWF World Rankings as of 5 May 2016.

Boxing

Cuba has entered ten male boxers to compete in each of the following weight classes into the Olympic boxing tournament. Olympic bronze medalist Yasniel Toledo was the only Cuban finishing among the top two of their respective weight division in the World Series of Boxing.

Five boxers (Argilagos, Veitía, Alvarez, López, and La Cruz) qualified through the 2015 World Championships, while Roniel Iglesias, Erislandy Savón and Lenier Pero had claimed their Olympic spots at the 2016 American Qualification Tournament in Buenos Aires, Argentina. London 2012 champion Robeisy Ramírez was the last Cuban boxer to upgrade an Olympic spot in the men's bantamweight division with a quarterfinal triumph at the 2016 AIBA World Qualifying Tournament in Baku, Azerbaijan.

Canoeing

Sprint
Cuban canoeists have qualified a single boat in the women's K-1 200 m for the Games through the 2015 ICF Canoe Sprint World Championships. Meanwhile, four additional boats were awarded to the Cuban squad at the 2016 Pan American Sprint Qualifier in Gainesville, Georgia, United States, either by winning their event or when the quota place for their event passed to the highest finisher not qualified.

Qualification Legend: FA = Qualify to final (medal); FB = Qualify to final B (non-medal)

Cycling

Road
Cuba has qualified one rider in the women's Olympic road race by virtue of a top 22 national finish in the 2016 UCI World Rankings.

Track
Following the completion of the 2016 UCI Track Cycling World Championships, Cuban riders have accumulated spots in the women's sprint, women's keirin, and women's omnium, by virtue of their final individual Olympic rankings in those events.

Sprint

Keirin

Omnium

Fencing

Cuba has entered one fencer into the Olympic competition, signifying the nation's sporting comeback after an eight-year hiatus. Yoendry Iriarte had claimed his Olympic spot in the men's sabre by virtue of a top two finish at the Pan American Zonal Qualifier in San José, Costa Rica.

Gymnastics

Artistic
Cuba has entered three artistic gymnasts into the Olympic competition. 2015 Pan American Games runner-up Manrique Larduet had claimed his Olympic spot in the men's apparatus and all-around events through the 2015 World Championships, while his teammate Randy Lerú performed the same feat, as well as Marcia Videaux in the women's at the Olympic Test Event in Rio de Janeiro.

Men

Women

Judo

Cuba has qualified a total of nine judokas for each of the following weight classes at the Games. Eight of them (five men and three women), including London 2012 champion Idalys Ortíz and silver medalist Asley González, were ranked among the top 22 eligible judokas for men and top 14 for women in the IJF World Ranking List of May 30, 2016, while Beijing 2008 runner-up Yalennis Castillo at women's half-heavyweight (78 kg) earned a continental quota spot from the Pan American region as the highest-ranked Cuban judoka outside of direct qualifying position.

Men

Women

Modern pentathlon

Cuban athletes have qualified for the following places to compete in modern pentathlon. José Figueroa and Leydi Moya secured a selection each in the men's and women's event respectively after obtaining one of the five Olympic slots from the Pan American Games.

Rowing

Cuba has qualified four boats for each of the following rowing classes into the Olympic regatta. Two of these crews had confirmed Olympic spots each in the men's single and double sculls at the 2015 FISA World Championships in Lac d'Aiguebelette, France, while the lightweight double sculls rowers had added one boat per gender to the Cuban roster with a top six finish at the 2016 Latin American Continental Qualification Regatta in Valparaíso, Chile.

Men

Women

Qualification Legend: FA=Final A (medal); FB=Final B (non-medal); FC=Final C (non-medal); FD=Final D (non-medal); FE=Final E (non-medal); FF=Final F (non-medal); SA/B=Semifinals A/B; SC/D=Semifinals C/D; SE/F=Semifinals E/F; QF=Quarterfinals; R=Repechage

Shooting

Cuban shooters have achieved quota places for the following events by virtue of their best finishes at the 2014 and 2015 ISSF World Championships, the 2015 ISSF World Cup series, the American Continental Championships, and the Pan American Games, as long as they obtained a minimum qualifying score (MQS) by March 31, 2016. A total of six Cuban shooters were named to the Olympic roster, including London 2012 champion Leuris Pupo (men's 25 m rapid fire pistol) and Olympic bronze medalists Juan Miguel Rodríguez (2004) and Eglis Yaima Cruz (2008).

Men

Women

Qualification Legend: Q = Qualify for the next round; q = Qualify for the bronze medal (shotgun)

Swimming

Cuba has received a Universality invitation from FINA to send two swimmers (one male and one female) to the Olympics.

Table tennis

Cuba has entered two athletes into the table tennis competition at the Games. Jorge Campos and 2012 Olympian Andy Pereira had secured their Olympic spots in the men's singles by virtue of their top six finish at the Latin American Qualification Tournament in Santiago, Chile.

Taekwondo

Cuba entered one athlete into the taekwondo competition at the Olympics. Rafael Alba secured a place in the men's heavyweight category (+80 kg) by virtue of his top two finish at the 2016 Pan American Qualification Tournament in Aguascalientes, Mexico.

Volleyball

Beach
Cuba men's beach volleyball team qualified directly for the Olympics by winning the final match over Canada at the 2016 NORCECA Continental Cup in Guaymas, Mexico.

Indoor

Men's tournament

Cuba men's volleyball team qualified for the Olympics by attaining a top finish and securing a lone outright berth at the NORCECA Olympic Qualifying Tournament in Edmonton, Canada, signifying the team's Olympic comeback for the first time since Sydney 2000.

Team roster

Group play

Weightlifting

Cuba has qualified one male and one female weightlifter for the Rio Olympics by virtue of a top seven national finish (for men) and top four (for women), respectively, at the 2016 Pan American Championships. The team must allocate these places to individual athletes by June 20, 2016.

Wrestling

Cuba has qualified a total of ten wrestlers for each of the following weight classes into the Olympic competition. Two of them had booked Olympic spots each in the men's Greco Roman (59 & 130 kg) at the 2015 World Championships, while the majority of Olympic berths were awarded to the Cuban wrestlers, who progressed to the top two finals at the 2016 Pan American Qualification Tournament.

Men's freestyle

Men's Greco-Roman

See also
Cuba at the 2015 Pan American Games
Cuba at the 2016 Summer Paralympics

References

External links 

 

Nations at the 2016 Summer Olympics
2016
2016 in Cuban sport